Throb is an American sitcom from the 1980s.

Throb may also refer to:

"Throb" (song), a 1993 song by Janet Jackson
Throb (Gary Burton album), 1969
Throb (haloblack album), 2004
The Throb, a 1960s Australian band
The Throbs, a 1980s/'90s American band
Robert Young (musician) (1964–2014), Scottish guitarist in Primal Scream, nicknamed "Throb"
site of the Throb nightclub disaster in South Africa